James Ellsworth may refer to:
 James Ellsworth (industrialist) (1849–1925), American industrialist, founder of Ellsworth, Pennsylvania
 James Ellsworth (wrestler) (1984), ring name of American professional wrestler James Morris
 James Ellsworth, one of FBI agents who broke the Duquesne Spy Ring

See also 
 James Ellsworth De Kay (1792–1851) American zoologist
 James Ellsworth Noland (1920–1992) U.S. Representative from Indiana and United States federal judge
 James E. Kyes (Commander James Ellsworth Kyes, 1906–1943), American naval officer